Typhoon Wendy was a weak typhoon that damaged Japan in August of the 1960 Pacific typhoon season. On August 10, a tropical depression formed near Typhoon Virginia and strengthened to a tropical storm later that day, receiving the name Wendy from the Joint Typhoon Warning Center (JTWC). The storm continued to intensify as it traveled toward the Japanese archipelago, becoming a typhoon a day after formation. The typhoon peaked with winds of  while located south of Japan. Wendy made landfalls in Shikoku and Honshu on August 12, and became extratropical on August 13. The Japan Meteorological Agency (JMA) stopped tracking the cyclone on August 15.

Wendy caused a large amount of damage in central Japan. The storm flooded thousands of homes and damaged significant tracts of land. Some rivers overflowed and hundreds of bridges were destroyed. Overall, 28 people were killed, and 19 were missing.

Meteorological history

On August 10, a trough extended southward from Typhoon Virginia, and was detected by the Joint Typhoon Warning Center (JTWC) as having abnormal wind directions compared to Virginia's circulation. The storm was not given the name Wendy until six hours later, when it was operationally upgraded to a tropical storm. The JMA also upgraded Wendy to a tropical storm at 12:00 UTC.

At 06:00 UTC, the JTWC issued its last advisory on Wendy, as it was no longer a hazard. The JMA declared the storm extratropical at the same time, and the agency continued to track the cyclone until it reached near the International Date Line at 18:00 UTC on August 15.

The development of the storm was considered unusual by the JTWC and the United States Weather Bureau (USWB). During most of its duration, Wendy did not sustain a circulation at  levels, and formed over an area of upper level convergence. Wendy also developed within the circulation of Virginia, which lead the JTWC to possibly consider Wendy as Virginia's "offspring".

Impact
Wendy caused damage to the Kinki and Chūbu regions of Japan from August 12 to 13. The floods caused the Nagara River to overflow its banks at four locations, and it also destroyed more than 260 bridges. The floods inundated 21,144 houses and destroyed 449 of them. It also damaged  of land, and more than 450 landslides were reported. In small villages across the Shizuoka and Gifu prefectures, 1,000 people were rescued by Japan Air Self-Defense Force helicopters. During the storm, 1,500 climbers were stranded in the Northern Alps, with no injuries and low supplies. The total count was 28 people killed, 19 missing, and 154 injuries. Three of those casualties were construction workers who were struck by lightning on a construction site in the Aichi Prefecture.

See also
Typhoon Ida (1958)
Typhoon Vera
Typhoon Nancy (1961)

Notes

References

W
W
Typhoons
1960 in Japan